Jenn Soto (born May 5, 1996) is a goofy-footed American skateboarder from Jersey City, New Jersey.

Skateboarding
Soto started skating in 6th grade.

In 2018, Soto won the Street League Skateboarding Pro Open London.

Soto placed 2nd at Dew Tour Long Beach 2018 and 2nd at Exposure Street Pro 2017.

Soto is among the 16 members of the inaugural U.S.A Skateboarding National Team announced in March, 2019. Soto will receive support from USA Skateboarding while she competes to qualify for the 2020 Tokyo Olympic Games in the Women's Street division.

References

External links
Skate Girls: Jenn Soto

1996 births
Living people
American skateboarders
Female skateboarders
Sportspeople from Jersey City, New Jersey
X Games athletes
American sportswomen
21st-century American women